John Forman (1823–2 September 1900) was a British trade unionist.

Born at Allerton Burn in Northumberland, Forman became a coal miner at an early age.  In the 1850s, he moved to Roddymoor in County Durham, where he was elected checkweighman at Grahamsley Colliery.  He became an active trade unionist, joining the Durham Miners' Association on its formation, and working as its agent for twenty-eight years.

Forman was also involved in mine rescue operations, including the explosions at Seaham Colliery in 1871 and 1880.  This led him to an interest in mine safety, and he was involved in theoretical work on the ignition of coal dust.  Forman was first elected as President of the Durham Miners' Association in 1871, and in 1874, this position was made permanent.  He served until his death in 1900.

References

1823 births
1900 deaths
British coal miners
British trade union leaders
Trade unionists from Northumberland